The 2009 West Virginia Mountaineer football team represented West Virginia University in the college football season of 2009. The Mountaineers were led by head coach Bill Stewart and played their home games on Mountaineer Field at Milan Puskar Stadium in Morgantown, West Virginia. The Mountaineers finished the season 9–4 (5–2 Big East) and lost in the Gator Bowl 33-21 to Florida State.

Schedule

Game summaries

Liberty

Jarrett Brown completed 19 of 26 passes for 243 yards and ran for a 22-yard touchdown, and redshirt freshman Tyler Bitancurt kicked four field goals to lead West Virginia to a 33–20 season-opening victory over Liberty.

East Carolina

West Virginia was able to overcome a mistake filled day to gain some payback on the East Carolina Pirates.  Quarterback Jarrett Brown had a career day completing 24 of 31 passes for 334 yards and 4 touchdowns, including a 58-yard bomb to freshman Tavon Austin.  Brown also picked up 73 yards on the ground.

Auburn

All-time record: Tied 1-1

This was the second meeting between West Virginia and Auburn, with the Mountaineers winning the first game 34–17 during the 2008 season.

Colorado

All-time record: Tied 1–1

This was the second meeting between West Virginia and Colorado, with the Buffaloes winning the first game 17–14 in overtime during the 2008 season. The game was designated a Gold Rush, meaning that fans attended the game wearing all gold. West Virginia scored early with a Noel Devine 77 yard touchdown run on the second play from scrimmage. Colorado responded with a 36-yard run from tailback Rodney Stewart. They then took the lead by making a 39-yard field goal.(He had missed 2 field goals earlier in the game.)West Virginia responded with a 6-yard touchdown pass from Jarrett Brown to Jock Sanders. Despite 4 fumbles lost in the first half for West Virginia, they still led 14–10 at halftime. The second half started with a 48-yard touchdown pass to receiver Bradley Starks to put the Mountaineers up 21–10, Colorado responded by converting on 4th and 10 for a 26-yard touchdown to trim the lead to 4. In the 4th quarter, freshmen fullback Ryan Clarke rumbled for a 1-yard touchdown run, and later ran for an 8-yard run putting the Mountaineers up 35–17 with 2 minutes to play. Colorado scored the final touchdown of the night with 3 seconds left, but it was too late for any sort of comeback as the Mountaineers won 35–24. Noel Devine had a career-high 220 yards rushing with an average of 10 yards per carry.

Syracuse

WVU jumped out to a 27–0 halftime lead en route to beating the Orange for an 8th straight time.  Jarrett Brown completed 22–30 passing for 244 yards and a touchdown pass to Noel Devine, who also had 97 yards on the ground with a touchdown.

Marshall

Starting QB Jarrett Brown was knocked out of the game on the Mountaineer's opening drive, forcing true freshman Geno Smith to step in.  The emotional punch of having Brown out of the game showed as Marshall was able to head into the half with a 7–3 lead.  WVU responded by scoring on its first possession of the second half, on the way to 21 second half points.  Smith finished 15–21 passing for 147 yards and a touchdown, Noel Devine added 103 yards on the ground scoring 2 touchdowns

Connecticut

South Florida

Louisville

Cincinnati

Pittsburgh

West Virginia's Tyler Bitancurt kicked a 43-yard field goal as time expired to give WVU a win in the 102nd Backyard Brawl. The 2009 Backyard Brawl, broadcast by ESPN2, was the most watched college football game in the history of ESPN2.

Rutgers

Florida State

2010 Konica Minolta Gator Bowl marked the final game for legendary Florida State coach Bobby Bowden, who also spent six seasons as head coach at West Virginia.

Rankings

Statistics

WVU Team Statistics Through 6 Games (10/18/09)

Scores by quarter

Offense

Rushing

Passing

Receiving

Special teams

References

West Virginia
West Virginia Mountaineers football seasons
West Virginia Mountaineers football